The Wallis and Futuna national rugby sevens team is a minor national team that competes in the Pacific Games and in regional tournaments.

The team contested the 2019 Pacific Games in Apia, Samoa.

Squad
Squad to 2011 Pacific Games 
Patelisio Pelo
Nive Atuhakevalu Vili
Jean-Louis Vakauliafa
Keleto Saliga
Leone Tini
Kafoalogologofolau Falemaa
Ronald Moeliku
Simione Filituulaga
Giovanny Paagalua
Leonale Christophe Muliloto
Manoahi Kauvaitupu
Mateasi Lamata

See also
Wallis and Futuna Rugby Committee
Rugby union in Wallis and Futuna
Rugby union in France

References

Rugby union in Wallis and Futuna 
National rugby sevens teams
R